Adam Bachmann (later Adam Randalu; 12 May 1890 Lüganuse Parish, Wierland County – 10 April 1966 Tallinn) was an Estonian politician. He was a member of I Riigikogu.

1920 he was Minister of Labor and Welfare.

References

1890 births
1966 deaths
People from Lüganuse Parish
People from Kreis Wierland
Estonian People's Party politicians
National Centre Party (Estonia) politicians
Government ministers of Estonia
Members of the Estonian Constituent Assembly
Members of the Riigikogu, 1920–1923
Members of the Riigikogu, 1932–1934